C cell may refer to:

Biology and medicine
 parafollicular cell, neuroendocrine cells in the thyroid gland which secrete calcitonin

Technology
 C battery, a common household 1.5 volt dry cell battery 
 C battery (vacuum tube), a battery used to power vacuum tubes in early electronic devices

See also
 Cell C, a South African cellular phone provider

 Cell (disambiguation)
 C (disambiguation)